A constitutional referendum was held in Palau on 23 October 1979, just three months after the constitution was first approved in July. The amendments were rejected by 69% of voters.

Results

References

1979 referendums
1979 in Palau
Referendums in Palau
Constitutional referendums in Palau
Election and referendum articles with incomplete results